Crozier head is an heraldic ordinary in the shape of the reversed letter S, symbolizing the river.

History 
It was used in the several coats of arms of heraldic clans of Poland, including: Drużyna, Srzeniawa, and Kopaszyna. It also is used in the coat of arms of Szydłowiec and Nowy Wiśnicz Until 1934, it was used in the coat of arms of Rynarzewo until 1934.

Gallery

Citations

Notes

References

Bibliography 
 Tadeusz Gajl, Herbarz polski od średniowiecza do XX wieku: ponad 4500 herbów szlacheckich 37 tysięcy nazwisk 55 tysięcy rodów. L&L, 2007. ISBN 978-83-60597-10-1.

Polish heraldry
Heraldic ordinaries